Metaegle is a genus of moths of the family Noctuidae.

Species
 Metaegle pallida (Staudinger, 1892)

References
Natural History Museum Lepidoptera genus database
Metaegle at funet

Hadeninae